The James Barker Band is a Canadian country group formed in Woodville, Ontario, in 2015. The band consists of James Barker, Taylor Abram, Connor Stephen, and Bobby Martin. In Canada, they have four number one country singles with "Chills", "Keep It Simple", "Over All Over Again", and "New Old Trucks". They are currently signed to RECORDS Nashville.

Career
In 2015, they won the Emerging Artist Showcase at the Boots and Hearts Music Festival and the following year, they were signed to Universal Music Canada. The band's debut extended play, Game On, was released April 21, 2017. The band received two Juno Award nominations for Breakthrough Group of the Year and Country Album of the Year at the 2018 Juno Awards, winning the second. In 2018, the band's song "Chills", cowritten by Barker, Gavin Slate, Travis Wood and Donovan Woods, received a SOCAN Songwriting Prize nomination and won the award for Single of the Year at the Canadian Country Music Awards.

The band became the first artist to record a globally released Spotify Singles session in Canada in November 2018. Their second extended play, Singles Only, was released May 24, 2019. They would follow that up with the standalone single "Summer Time" in June 2020, and the extended play JBB-Sides in August 2020.

In May 2021, they signed a record deal with Sony Music Nashville and Villa 40, and released the single "Over All Over Again", which became their third Canada Country number one. In October 2021, they released the song "New Old Trucks", which features American country singer Dierks Bentley. They followed that up with "Wastin' Whiskey" in 2022 on Starseed Records. In the spring and summer of 2022, the band joined Dallas Smith as opening acts on his headlining "Some Things Never Change Tour" across Canada. In January 2023, the band signed with RECORDS Nashville, a joint venture between Sony Music Entertainment and Barry Weiss, and released the single "Meet Your Mama".

Discography

Extended plays

Singles

Music videos

Awards and nominations

Notes

References

External links
Official website

Canadian country music groups
Musical groups with year of establishment missing
Juno Award for Country Album of the Year winners
Musical groups from Ontario
Canadian Country Music Association Single of the Year winners